The "Complaints of Khakheperraseneb", also called the "Lamentations of Khakheperraseneb", is an ancient Egyptian text from the end of the First Intermediate Period or the beginning of the Middle Kingdom.[1]  It was on a writing board which suggests it was regarded as a text for school and is currently held in the British Museum.[2] The dating is not established as fact, but is thought to be near that time period and the writing of Khakheperraseneb tells a story of suffering.[3]  The interpretation of the work is up to debate; scholars believe that this piece is either a literary composition or a work about the issues in Egypt surrounding Khakheperraseneb at the time.

Middle Kingdom (ca. 2055 – 1650)

The Middle Kingdom was a period of reunification after Mentuhotep II’s defeat of the rival 10th Dynasty of Herakleopolis that would last for about 400 years.[4]  While the Old Kingdom could be defined by their large tombs and pyramids the Middle Kingdom holds no such trait and was more of a time of change.[5]  The Middle Kingdom was a time of strong kings and military expansion into lower Nubia led by 12th Dynasty kings Senusret I and Senusret III.[6] The Middle Kingdom was a period of powerful kings and military might.  Going in to the 13th dynasty there were many kings and the throne was passed along from ruler to ruler, but this “image of chaos is contradicted, however, by the contemporary documentation on court officials.[7]”  The Middle Kingdom was by many accounts a stable period of powerful kings up until the 13th Dynasty that would eventually transition in to the Second Intermediate Period.

Middle Kingdom literature

The Middle Kingdom was known for its cultural realm, and the works of literature during this time would later be referred to as classics by Ancient Egyptians.[8]  Literature had a strong impact and “many of the works known today were composed in the Middle Kingdom, and later Egyptians saw several of them as classics.[9]”  The writings in the Old Kingdom were somewhat limited, but that changed in the Middle Kingdom when different genres were able to develop.[10]  The Middle Kingdom was a period of creativity that was not possible earlier in Egyptian history.

Interpretation

The Complaints of Khakheperraseneb has been regarded as purely a literary composition.  Since the writing was likely during the reigns of Senwosret III or Amenemhet III it is seen as literature because evidence points to these reigns being prosperous.[11]  Miriam Lichtheim believes that the Complaints are nothing more than literature although she does leave the door open for possible political criticism.[12]  When Gardiner interpreted the work he also saw it as nothing more than a literary composition and “for him the work is no great achievement.[13]” Evidence showed that Egypt was largely in a prosperous state at the likely time of the writing.  Other scholars feel that the writing holds a stronger and more significant message.

Jan Assmann for example believes that this piece from Khakheperraseneb is an expression of a problem only authors feel, and that problem is the pressure to create something new.[14]  Khakheperraseneb sees the “lack of originality among the contemporaries” of his time and he is very much aware of the repetitiveness of his time and he wants something new to say.[15] Assman continues on by saying that “the bard embodies and performs a tradition, an author changes it by adding to it.[16]”

Fragmented Work?

Without any new evidence, it cannot be said for certain, but given the fact that the work that we have is only 20 lines suggests that the writing board is a fraction of the original work.[17]  It would be hard to believe that “Khakheperraseneb’s reputation should have rested on so slender a foundation.[18]”  Further evidence is the fact that Khakheperraseneb “is included in the list of sages preserved in Papyrus Chester Beatty IV, and in a similar list inscribed on a tomb wall at Saqqara.[19]”  A writer who is revered would either have had more well-known compositions or his complaints were originally a larger piece and astounded future Egyptians looking back on his work.

References

[1] Kadish, Gerald E. "British Museum Writing Board 5645: The Complaints of KhaKheper-Rē'-Senebu." The Journal of Egyptian Archaeology 59 (1973): 89. 

[2] Lichtheim, Miriam, and Antonio Loprieno. 2006. Ancient Egyptian Literature. Volume I, the Old and Middle Kingdoms. Berkeley, Calif. ; London: University of California Press.

[3] Kadish, “Writing Board 5645,” 89.

[4] Van de Mieroop, Marc. 2011. A History of Ancient Egypt. Chichester, West Sussex ; Malden, MA: Wiley-Blackwell: 97.

[5] Van de Mieroop, A History of Ancient Egypt, 97.

[6] Van de Mieroop, A History of Ancient Egypt, 113.

[7] Van de Mieroop, A History of Ancient Egypt, 107.

[8] Van de Mieroop, A History of Ancient Egypt, 97.

[9] Van de Mieroop, A History of Ancient Egypt, 121.

[10] Van de Mieroop, A History of Ancient Egypt, 122.

[11] Bell, Barbara. "Climate and the History of Egypt: The Middle Kingdom." American Journal of Archaeology 79, no. 3 (1975): 259. 

[12] Lichtheim and Loprieno, Ancient Egyptian Literature, 440.

[13] Ockinga, Boyo G. "The Burden of Kha'kheperrē'sonbu." The Journal of Egyptian Archaeology 69 (1983): 88. 

[14] Assmann, Jan. "Cultural Memory and the Myth of the Axial Age." In The Axial Age and Its Consequences, edited by Bellah Robert N. and Joas Hans, 366-408. Cambridge, Massachusetts; London, England: Harvard University Press, 2012: 382. 

[15] Ockinga, “The Burden of Kha’kheperrē'sonbu,” 88.

[16] Assman, “Myth of the Axial Age,” 382.

[17] Kadish, “Writing Board 5645,” 84.

[18] Kadish, “Writing Board 5645,” 84.

[19] Ockinga, “The Burden of Kha’kheperrē'sonbu,” 88.

Bibliography
Assmann, Jan. "Cultural Memory and the Myth of the Axial Age." In The Axial Age and Its Consequences, edited by Bellah Robert N. and Joas Hans, 366-408. Cambridge, Massachusetts; London, England: Harvard University Press, 2012. 

Bell, Barbara. "Climate and the History of Egypt: The Middle Kingdom." American Journal of Archaeology 79, no. 3 (1975): 223-69. 

Kadish, Gerald E. "British Museum Writing Board 5645: The Complaints of Kha-Kheper-Rē'-Senebu." The Journal of Egyptian Archaeology 59 (1973): 77-90. 

Lichtheim, Miriam, and Antonio Loprieno. 2006. Ancient Egyptian Literature. Volume I, the Old and Middle Kingdoms. Berkeley, Calif. ; London: University of California Press.

Ockinga, Boyo G. "The Burden of Kha'kheperrē'sonbu." The Journal of Egyptian Archaeology 69 (1983): 88-95. 

Van de Mieroop, Marc. 2011. A History of Ancient Egypt. Chichester, West Sussex ; Malden, MA: Wiley-Blackwell.

Ancient Egyptian texts